Mahmoud Hessabi (or Hessaby, February 23, 1903 – September 3, 1992) was an Iranian nuclear physicist and senator. He was the  Minister of Education of Pahlavi Iran in the cabinet of Prime Minister Mohammad Mosaddegh from 1951 to 1952.

Life
Hessabi was born in Tehran to the family of Abbas and Goharshad Hessabi. His family's hometown is Tafresh, Markazi province, Iran. His family moved to Beirut in 1907 when his father was appointed consul at the Iranian embassy. There Hessabi attended primary school. He was still in secondary school when World War I started prompting the closure of his school; Hessabi continued his studies at home and in 1922, he earned a degree in road engineering from the American University of Beirut. After briefly working for the Ministry of Roads, Beirut, Hessabi travelled to Paris for further education, he was awarded a degree in electrical engineering at the École Superieure d'Electricité and later a doctorate degree in 1927. In Paris, he worked with Aime Cotton.

In Tehran, Hessabi was affiliated with the University of Tehran and organized the science and engineering faculties of the university, he was a teacher of Alenush Terian while she studied at the university. In June 1951, Hessabi was appointed to a three-man provincial board of the Iranian oil company, the designated successor of the Anglo-Iranian Oil Company. In December, 1951, he replaced Karim Sanjaby as education minister. Between 1961 and 1969, Hessabi was Iran's representative on the Scientific and Technical Subcommittee, United Nations Committee on the Peaceful Uses of Outer Space.

Museum
In 1992 his house changed to a museum to for recognition of his life. The Mahmoud Hessabi museum is located Tajrish neighborhood in Tehran.

Selected works

See also 
 Mahmoud Hessabi museum
 Physics Society of Iran
 List of contemporary Iranian scientists, scholars, and engineers
 List of Iranian senators
 Markazi Province

References

External links
Hessaby Foundation

1903 births
1992 deaths
Scientists from Tehran
University of Paris alumni
American University of Beirut alumni
Government ministers of Iran
Iranian physicists
Members of the Academy of Persian Language and Literature
People from Tafresh
Members of the Senate of Iran
Recipients of the Legion of Honour
20th-century Iranian engineers